Indragarh Sumerganj Mandi railway stationis a railway station in Bundi district, Rajasthan. Its code is IDG. It serves Indragarh and Sumerganj Mandi. The station consists of 2 platforms. Passenger, Express, and Superfast trains halt here.

References

Railway stations in Bundi district
Kota railway division